Three-time defending champion Chris Evert defeated Pam Shriver in the final, 7–5, 6–4 to win the women's singles tennis title at the 1978 US Open. It was her fourth consecutive US Open title (an Open Era record), her fourth US Open singles title overall, and her eighth major singles title overall. At 16 years and two months of age, Shriver became the youngest major finalist in the Open Era.

This was the first edition of the tournament to be held on hardcourts, having been held on clay the previous three years and on grass before that.

This marked the final major appearance for two-time major champion and former singles world No. 2 Nancy Richey; she lost in the first round to Lesley Hunt.

Seeds
The seeded players are listed below. Chris Evert is the champion; others show the round in which they were eliminated.

  Martina Navratilova (semifinalist)
  Chris Evert (champion)
  Virginia Wade (third round)
  Wendy Turnbull (semifinalist)
  Tracy Austin (quarterfinalist)
  Dianne Fromholtz (third round)
  Betty Stöve (fourth round)
  Kerry Reid (fourth round)
  Marise Kruger (first round)
  Mima Jaušovec (second round)
  Virginia Ruzici (quarterfinalist)
  Regina Maršíková (fourth round)
  Marita Redondo (fourth round)
  JoAnne Russell (second round)
  Kathy May (quarterfinalist)
  Pam Shriver (finalist)

Qualifying

Draw

Key
 Q = Qualifier
 WC = Wild card
 LL = Lucky loser
 r = Retired

Final eight

Earlier rounds

Section 1

Section 2

Section 3

Section 4

Section 5

Section 6

Section 7

Section 8

References

External links
1978 US Open – Women's draws and results at the International Tennis Federation

Women's Singles
US Open (tennis) by year – Women's singles
1978 in women's tennis
1978 in American women's sports